Outlook station is a railway depot in Outlook in Sheridan County, Montana which was listed on the National Register of Historic Places in 1993 as the Outlook Depot.  It has also been known as Soo Line Depot.  The listing included two contributing buildings.

It was deemed notable as "one of the best-preserved small-town railroad stations in Montana." It is a standard "second-class" depot built by the Minneapolis, St. Paul, & Sault Ste. Marie Railroad ("the Soo Line") in 1913. In 1993 it was operated by the Dakota, Missouri Valley & Western Railroad. The depot is located on the north side of the east–west railway which runs along the south side of the small town of Outlook (population 109 in 1990).

The station's privy, located to the west of the depot, is the second contributing building.

References

National Register of Historic Places in Sheridan County, Montana
Railway stations on the National Register of Historic Places in Montana
Former Soo Line stations
Former railway stations in Montana
1913 establishments in Montana
Railway stations in the United States opened in 1913